Rudolf Pannwitz (27 May 1881 in Crossen/Oder, Province of Brandenburg, Prussia – 23 March 1969 in Astano, Ticino, Switzerland) was a German writer, poet and philosopher. His thought combined nature philosophy, Nietzsche, an opposition to nihilism and pan-European internationalism:

Life

Pannwitz was educated at the University of Marburg before moving to Berlin to continue studying. Through Gertrud Kantorowicz, a cousin of Ernst Kantorowicz and friend of Georg Simmel, he was introduced to Sabine Lepsius and the poetry of Stefan George. Pannwitz's poem 'Das Totengedicht' [The Poem of the Dead] was published in George's literary magazine, Blätter für die Kunst. George and Nietzsche were lasting influences upon Pannwitz. In 1904 Pannwitz cofounded the periodical Charon with Otto zur Linde, co-editing it until 1906. His 1917 book The Crisis of European Culture impressed Hugo von Hofmannsthal, though Hofmannsthal later distanced himself from Pannwitz.

From 1921 to 1948 Pannwitz lived on the small island of Koločep. In 1968 he received the Gryphius Prize.

Works

Prose
 Die Erziehung, 1909
 Formenkunde der Kirche, 1912
 Die Krisis der europäischen Kultur, 1917
 Die deutsche Lehre, 1919
 Grundriß einer Geschichte meiner Kultur 1886 bis 1906, 1921
 Kosmos Atheos, 1926
 Die Freiheit der Menschen, 1926
 Logos, Eidos, Bios, 1930 
 Der Ursprung und das Wesen der Geschlechter, 1936
 Nietzsche und die Verwandlung des Menschen, 1940
 Weg des Menschen, 1942
 Das Weltalter und die Politik, 1948
 Der Nihilismus und die werdende Welt, 1951
 Nach Siebzig Jahren, 1951
 Beiträge zu einer europäischen Kultur, 1954

Poetry
 Prometheus, 1902
 Dionysische Tragödien, 1913
 Mythen, 1919-1921, In 9 Parts, including Das Kind Aion, Der Elf, Das Lied vom Ehlen, Faustus und Helena, Der Gott, and Logos.
 Urblick, 1926
 Hymnen aus Widars Wiederkehr, 1927
 König Laurin, 1956
 Wasser wird sich ballen, 1963

References

Further reading
 Alessandro Gamba, Mondo disponibile e mondo prodotto. Rudolf Pannwitz filosofo, Vita e Pensiero, Milano 2007.

External links

 

1969 deaths
1881 births
People from Krosno Odrzańskie
People from the Province of Brandenburg
German male poets
20th-century German poets
20th-century German male writers
Commanders Crosses of the Order of Merit of the Federal Republic of Germany
20th-century German philosophers